The lesser large-footed bat (Myotis hasseltii) is a species of vesper bat. It can be found in Cambodia, India, Indonesia, Malaysia, Myanmar, Sri Lanka, Thailand, and Vietnam.

References

Mouse-eared bats
Mammals of India
Mammals of Sri Lanka
Taxonomy articles created by Polbot
Taxa named by Coenraad Jacob Temminck
Mammals described in 1840
Bats of Asia

ms:Kelawar Bakau